"The Edge of Mystery" is the eighth episode of the second season of the American television series Agent Carter, inspired by the films Captain America: The First Avenger and Captain America: The Winter Soldier, and the Marvel One-Shot short film also titled Agent Carter. It features the Marvel Comics character Peggy Carter trying to defeat Whitney Frost, and is set in the Marvel Cinematic Universe (MCU), sharing continuity with the films of the franchise. The episode was written by Brant Engelstein and directed by Metin Hüseyin.

Hayley Atwell reprises her role as Carter from the film series, and is joined by regular cast members James D'Arcy, Chad Michael Murray, and Enver Gjokaj.

"The Edge of Mystery" originally aired on ABC on February 23, 2016, and according to Nielsen Media Research, was watched by 2.50 million viewers.

Plot

Whitney Frost tells Jason Wilkes that if he accepts the power of the Zero Matter within him then he will be able to control it. Peggy Carter and Daniel Sousa meet with Frost, giving her fake uranium in exchange for Wilkes. Frost soon realizes the ruse, and pursues them. Wilkes, learning to control his abilities and change between corporeal and non-corporeal states, turns on Carter, demanding that Sousa reveal the location of the real uranium. Sousa directs him to a vault at the Strategic Scientific Reserve (SSR). Ana Jarvis survives surgery, but loses the ability to have children. Jack Thompson overhears Frost telling Masters to retrieve the uranium, but is incapacitated by Masters. Carter and Sousa join Thompson, and, along with Edwin Jarvis and a new gamma cannon courtesy of Howard Stark, travel to the Isodyne atomic testing area. Wilkes is sucked into a rift created by the now armed atomic bomb, but the cannon closes the rift and returns Wilkes, now full of Zero Matter. A revenge-seeking Jarvis shoots Frost, but she survives due to her Zero Matter. Jarvis and Carter are taken hostage by Joseph Manfredi's men.

Production

Development
In February 2016, Marvel announced that the eighth episode of the season would be titled "The Edge of Mystery", to be written by Brant Engelstein, with Metin Hüseyin directing.

Casting

In February 2016, Marvel revealed that main cast members Hayley Atwell, James D'Arcy, Enver Gjokaj, Wynn Everett, Reggie Austin, and Chad Michael Murray would star as Peggy Carter, Edwin Jarvis, Daniel Sousa, Whitney Frost, Jason Wilkes, and Jack Thompson, respectively. It was also revealed that the guest cast for the episode would include Lotte Verbeek as Ana Jarvis, Lesley Boone as Rose, Rey Valentin as Agent Vega, Kurtwood Smith as Vernon Masters, Brian Glanney as Agent Ford, Ken Marino as Joseph Manfredi, Tina D'Marco as Nonna, Matt Braunger as Dr. Samberly, Tom T. Choi as Doctor Chung, Russell Edge as Agent Blackwell, Tim Brown as snub-nose and Damian O'Hare as Nick Driscoll. Edge, Brown, and O'Hare did not receive guest star credit in the episode, while Everett and Austin received guest star credit instead of regular starring. Verbeek, Boone, Valentin, Smith, Marino, Braunger, and Choi reprise their roles from earlier in the series.

Release

Broadcast
"The Edge of Mystery" was first aired in the United States on ABC on February 23, 2016.

Reception

Ratings
In the United States the episode received a 0.8/2 percent share among adults between the ages of 18 and 49, meaning that it was seen by 0.8 percent of all households, and 2 percent of all of those watching television at the time of the broadcast. It was watched by 2.50 million viewers.

References

External links
 "The Edge of Mystery" at ABC
 

Agent Carter (TV series) episodes
2016 American television episodes